The Smile are an English rock band comprising Radiohead members Thom Yorke (vocals, guitar, bass, keys) and Jonny Greenwood (guitar, bass, keys) with drummer Tom Skinner. They are produced by Nigel Godrich, Radiohead's longtime producer. The band incorporate elements of post-punk, progressive rock, Afrobeat, and electronic music.

The Smile worked during the COVID-19 lockdowns and made their surprise debut in a performance streamed by Glastonbury Festival in May 2021. In early 2022, they released six singles and performed to an audience for the first time at three shows in London, which were livestreamed. In May, the Smile released their debut album, A Light for Attracting Attention, to acclaim, and began an international tour. They released an EP, The Smile (Live at Montreux Jazz Festival, July 2022), in December 2022.

History 
The Smile are composed of Jonny Greenwood and Thom Yorke of Radiohead with the drummer Tom Skinner. Skinner, who had played with acts including the jazz band Sons of Kemet, first worked with Greenwood when he played on his soundtrack to the 2012 film The Master. The Smile members agreed not to give interviews about the project.The Smile are produced by Nigel Godrich, Radiohead's longtime producer. Godrich said the project emerged from Greenwood "writing all these riffs, waiting for something to happen" during the  COVID-19 lockdown. He cited the pandemic and the unavailability of the Radiohead guitarist Ed O'Brien, who was busy with his debut solo album, Earth, as motivating factors. Radiohead's drummer, Philip Selway, said it was "healthy" for the members to explore different projects and "see what these other musical voices can do with your ideas". Greenwood said: "We didn't have much time, but we just wanted to finish some songs together. It's been very stop-start, but it's felt a happy way to make music."   

The Smile take their name from the title of a poem by Ted Hughes. Yorke said it was "not the smile as in 'ahh', more the smile as in the guy who lies to you every day".

First performances 
The Smile made their debut in a surprise performance for the concert video Live at Worthy Farm, produced by Glastonbury Festival and streamed on May 22, 2021. The performance was recorded in secret earlier that week and announced on the day of the stream. The band performed eight songs, with Yorke and Greenwood on guitar, bass, Moog synthesiser and Rhodes piano.

Yorke performed a Smile song, "Free in the Knowledge", at the Letters Live event at the Royal Albert Hall, London, in October 2021. On January 29 and 30, 2022, the Smile performed to an audience for the first time at three shows at Magazine, London, which were livestreamed. They played in the round, and debuted several tracks, including "Speech Bubbles", "A Hairdryer", "Waving a White Flag" and "The Same". The shows also included performances of "Open the Floodgates", which Yorke first performed in 2010, and a cover of the 1979 Joe Jackson single "It's Different for Girls". 

In NME, James Balmont gave the London show four out five, describing it as "meticulous, captivating stuff". In the Guardian, Kitty Empire gave it four out of five, writing that "the Smile are most musically convincing when they stretch farther away from Radiohead", while Alexis Petridis gave it three, saying it was "intriguing rather than dazzling, intermittently spellbinding, filled with fascinating ideas that don't always coalesce".

A Light for Attracting Attention 

On 20 April 2022, the Smile announced their debut album, A Light for Attracting Attention. It was released digitally through XL Recordings on 13 May, followed by a retail release on 17 June, and reached number five on the UK Albums Chart. It received acclaim; the Pitchfork critic Ryan Dombal wrote that it was "instantly, unmistakably the best album yet by a Radiohead side project". The first single, "You Will Never Work in Television Again", was released on streaming platforms on 5 January 2022. It was followed by "The Smoke", "Skrting on the Surface", "Pana-vision", "Free In The Knowledge", and "Thin Thing". 

On 16 May, the Smile began a tour of Europe and North America. The tour included performances of the unreleased song "Just Eyes and Mouth", Yorke's 2009 single "FeelingPulledApartByHorses" and new material. They were joined for some songs by the saxophonist Robert Stillman. On 30 January 2023, the Smile announced a North American tour to begin in mid-2023, including their first show in Mexico City.

Live EPs 
On 14 December, the Smile released a digital-only EP, The Smile (Live at Montreux Jazz Festival, July 2022), with songs from their performance at the Montreux Jazz Festival, Switzerland. On 10 March, 2023, the Smile released a limited-edition vinyl EP, Europe: Live Recordings 2022, including a performance of "FeelingPulledApartByHorses".

Style 
Consequence wrote that the Smile incorporate elements of post-punk, proto-punk and math rock. Pitchfork likened them to Radiohead's "vintage rock sensibilities", with a "slight bounce" in Skinner's drumming and "unfamiliar aggression" in Greenwood's basslines. On several Smile songs, Greenwood uses a delay effect to create "angular" synchronised repeats. The Guardian critic Alexis Petridis said the Smile "sound like a simultaneously more skeletal and knottier version of Radiohead", incorporating progressive rock influences with unusual time signatures, complex riffs and "hard-driving" motorik psychedelia. The Guardian critic Kitty Empire noted Afrobeat elements in "Just Eyes and Mouth" and influence from 1960s electronic music and systems music in "Open the Floodgates" and "The Same". Reviewing "You Will Never Work in Television Again", the Pitchfork critic Jayson Greene described it as a "raw-boned rock number" reminiscent of Radiohead's 1995 album The Bends.

Members 

 Jonny Greenwood – guitar, bass, keyboards, piano, harp
 Tom Skinner – drums, percussion, keyboards, backing vocals 
 Thom Yorke – vocals, bass, guitar, keyboards, piano

Additional live members 
 Robert Stillman — saxophone

Discography

Studio album

EPs

Singles

References

English art rock groups
2021 establishments in the United Kingdom
Musical groups established in 2021
Radiohead
XL Recordings artists